Govan is an unincorporated community in Lincoln County, in US state of Washington. Today an abandoned school house, post office and grain elevator, along with a few houses both abandoned and occupied, are all that remain. It is considered to be a ghost town.

History
The school house in Govan was built in 1905 and shut down in the 1940s. The steeple on the building toppled over in 2019. Two fires came through Govan, the most recent in 1974, that ultimately led to the town's abandonment. As of 2019 the population of the area was just three people.

Multiple unsolved murders took place in Govan before it was abandoned. In December of 1902, Judge J.A. Lewis and his wife were murdered with an axe at their home in Govan. Robbery, as they were quite wealthy, was considered to be the motive. It was referred to at the time as "one of the most atrocious murders in the history of the state." In 1941 a woman was found murdered on her farm in Govan around the same time that her son went missing. The son's body was found in nearby fields eight years later.

Gallery

References

Lincoln County, Washington